Sapian, officially the Municipality of Sapian (Capiznon/Hiligaynon: Banwa sang Sapian; Aklanon: Banwa it Sapian), and sometimes spelled Sapi-an, is a 4th class municipality in the province of Capiz, Philippines. According to the 2020 census, it has a population of 26,697 people.

Sapian Bay which is situated in the northern part of the municipality is geographically joined with Capiz Bay. The 30 km2 Sapian and Capiz shallow sea bays has extensive intertidal mudflats, sandy beaches, mangrove swamps, estuaries of several small rivers, and associated coastal lagoons and marshes. Sapian Bay which opens up to the Sibuyan Sea is a source of livelihood for many Sapianons. Marine produce from Sapian Bay include green mussels "tahong", oyster "talaba", lobster and different species of fish, and clams. Many lands near sea water were developed into fishponds that produce milkfish (bangus), prawns and crabs.

Another source of livelihood is agriculture. Carpets of rice fields, trees and flowers can be seen as one travels through Sapian along the national road which connect Roxas City to Iloilo and Aklan. The ricefield along the national road are slowly disappearing to give way to housing developments. Sapian's main agricultural produce are rice and coconuts.

Geography

Barangays
Sapian is politically subdivided into 10 barangays.
 Agsilab
 Agtatacay Norte
 Agtatacay Sur
 Bilao
 Damayan
 Dapdapan
 Lonoy
 Majanlud
 Maninang
 Poblacion

Climate

Demographics

Languages
Capiznon and Hiligaynon are the main languages of Sapian, but Aklanon is also spoken and understood due to its proximity to Aklan.

The town center
In the center of town (or poblacion) is a well-maintained park known simply as the plaza. It is the venue of many celebrations especially during the town fiesta. The people of Sapian show lavish cultural and religious celebrations from July 22 to 26 each year in honour of their patron saint Santa Ana.

A few meters away from the plaza is the municipal hall which holds local government offices. Next to it is the barangay hall and health clinic. Nearby is Sapian Elementary School, two big churches, the Catholic Church and the Aglipayan Church, and the public market.

About one kilometre from the town center is Sapian National High School and Capiz State University (CAPSU) Sapian Campus.

Economy

References

External links
The Original Website of Sapian
 [ Philippine Standard Geographic Code]
Philippine Census Information

Municipalities of Capiz